George Robertson may refer to:

Politicians
George Robertson (congressman) (1790–1874), U.S. Representative from Kentucky
George Morison Robertson (1821–1867), Hawaiian politician
George W. Robertson (1838–1906), New York politician
George Wilson Robertson (1889–1963), politician in Saskatchewan, Canada
George Robertson, Baron Robertson of Port Ellen (born 1946), UK Defence Secretary, NATO Secretary-General

Sportspeople
George Robertson (bobsleigh) (born 1958), British Olympic bobsledder
George Robertson (cricketer) (1842–1895), Australian cricketer
George Robertson (footballer, born 1883) (1883–?), Scottish footballer, played for Clyde, Blackburn Rovers and Birmingham
George Robertson (footballer, born 1885) (1885–1937), Scottish footballer, played for Motherwell, Sheffield Wednesday, East Fife and Scotland
George Robertson (footballer, born 1915) (1915–2006), Scottish footballer, played for Kilmarnock and Scotland
George Robertson (footballer, born 1930) (1930–2003), Scottish footballer, played for Plymouth Argyle
George Robertson (ice hockey) (1927–2021), hockey player
George Robertson (racing driver) (1884–1955), American racing driver
George Robertson (rugby union) (1859–1920), New Zealand rugby union footballer
George Robertson (swimmer) (active in 1920), British swimmer
George André Robertson (1929–2007), British educator and cricketer
George S. Robertson (1872–1967), British athlete
George Robertson (rugby league), Australian rugby league footballer

Others
George Robertson (painter) (–1788), English landscape painter
George Robertson (writer) (–1832), Scottish topographical, agricultural and genealogical writer
George Robertson (bookseller) (1825–1898), Scottish-Australian bookseller
George Robertson (publisher) (1860–1933), Scottish-Australian publisher; founder of Angus & Robertson
George Croom Robertson (1842–1892), Scottish philosopher
George G. Robertson (active since 1972), American information visualization expert
George R. Robertson (born 1933), American actor
George Scott Robertson (1852–1916), British soldier, author, and administrator